Våler or Vålbyen is the administrative center of Våler Municipality in Innlandet county, Norway. The Norwegian National Road 2 and the Solørbanen railway line both run through the village.

Between 1910 and 1994, the village was served by Våler Station which sat along on the Solørbanen railway line. Våler Church is also located in the village. The Haslemoen Airstrip lies just outside the village and it is used for small recreational aircraft. It is located on the site of the former Haslemoen military base before its closure in 2003.

References

Våler, Innlandet
Villages in Innlandet